Beware of Darkness may refer to:
Beware of Darkness (album), an album by Spock's Beard
Beware of Darkness (band), an American rock band
"Beware of Darkness" (song), a song by George Harrison